State v. Warshow, Supreme Court of Vermont, 410 A.2d 1000 (1980), is a criminal case  that set forth conditions for a defense of necessity in civil disobedience during political protests. Four requirements were described that apply to other necessity defenses.

The court wrote:

References

United States criminal case law
Civil disobedience
1980 in United States case law